A cartoonist is a visual artist who specializes in both drawing and writing cartoons (individual images) or comics (sequential images). Cartoonists differ from comics writers or comic book illustrators in that they produce both the literary and graphic components of the work as part of their practice. Cartoonists may work in a variety of formats, including booklets, comic strips, comic books, editorial cartoons, graphic novels, manuals, gag cartoons, storyboards, posters, shirts, books, advertisements, greeting cards, magazines, newspapers, webcomics, and video game packaging.

Terminology

Cartoonists may also be denoted by terms such as comics artist, comic book artist, graphic novel artist or graphic novelist.

Ambiguity may arise because "comic book artist" may also refer to the person who only illustrates the comic, and "graphic novelist" may also refer to the person who only writes the script.

History

The English satirist and editorial cartoonist William Hogarth, who emerged in the 18th century, poked fun at contemporary politics and customs; illustrations in such style are often referred to as "Hogarthian". Following the work of Hogarth, political cartoons began to develop in England in the latter part of the 18th century under the direction of its great exponents, James Gillray and Thomas Rowlandson, both from London. Gillray explored the use of the medium for lampooning and caricature, calling the king (George III), prime ministers and generals to account, and has been referred to as the father of the political cartoon.

Origin in the U.S. 
While never a professional cartoonist, Benjamin Franklin is credited with the first cartoon published in The Pennsylvania Gazette in 1754: Join, or Die, depicting the American colonies as segments of a snake.  In the 19th century, professional cartoonists such as Thomas Nast, whose work appeared in Harper's Weekly, introduced other familiar American political symbols, such as the Republican elephant.

Comic strips
Comic strips received widespread distribution to mainstream newspapers by syndicates. 

Calum MacKenzie, in his preface to the exhibition catalog, The Scottish Cartoonists (Glasgow Print Studio Gallery, 1979) defined the selection criteria: 
The difference between a cartoonist and an illustrator was the same as the difference between a comedian and a comedy actor—the former both deliver their own lines and take full responsibility for them, the latter could always hide behind the fact that it was not his entire creation.

Many strips were the work of two people although only one signature was displayed. Shortly after Frank Willard began Moon Mullins in 1923, he hired Ferd Johnson as his assistant. For decades, Johnson received no credit. Willard and Johnson traveled about Florida, Maine, Los Angeles, and Mexico, drawing the strip while living in hotels, apartments and farmhouses. At its peak of popularity during the 1940s and 1950s, the strip ran in 350 newspapers. According to Johnson, he had been doing the strip solo for at least a decade before Willard's death in 1958: "They put my name on it then. I had been doing it about 10 years before that because Willard had heart attacks and strokes and all that stuff. The minute my name went on that thing and his name went off, 25 papers dropped the strip. That shows you that, although I had been doing it ten years, the name means a lot."

See also

Comic book creator
Penciller
Editorial cartoonist
Harvey Award
List of cartoonists
List of newspaper comic strips
Mangaka
List of manga artists
The Someday Funnies
Webcomic
Female comics creators
 Glossary of comics terminology
 Daily comic strip
 Sunday comics
 Sunday strip

References

Citations

Works cited

Further reading
 Steve Edgell, Tim Pilcher, Brad Brooks, The Complete Cartooning Course: Principles, Practices, Techniques (London: Barron's, 2001).

External links

Societies and organizations
Professional Cartoonists' Organisation (UK)
National Cartoonists Society
Association of American Editorial Cartoonists
Society of Illustrators
Society of Children’s Book Writers and Illustrators
Society of Illustrators of Los Angeles
The Association of Illustrators
The Illustrators Partnership of America
AIIQ - l’Association des Illustrateurs et Illustratrices du Québec
Colorado Alliance of Illustrators
Institute For Archaeologists Graphics Archaeology Group
Guild of Natural Science Illustrators
Guild of Natural Science Illustrators-Northwest
Illustrators Australia
Newsart
Australian Cartoonists Association 2Xw7QIe

Communities
Cartoonist Club
DeviantART
ConceptArt
toonsUp
Mojizu
Illustrateur
Comic Design
SteamKat

 

 
Visual arts occupations
Comics
Cartooning